Pidurangala Vihara is an ancient Buddhist temple situated in Pidurangala village of Matale District, Sri Lanka. The temple was constructed on a massive rock called Pidurangala, which is located a few kilometers north of the historical fort Sigiriya.

Etymology
It is said that the name  was derived from the Sinhala words . In English language it means "offered piles of gold".

History
It is believed that the history of Pidurangala Vihara goes back beyond to the first and second century BC. From those days Pidurangala was used as a Buddhist monastery  but became a prominent place during the reign of King Kashyapa (473 - 495 AC).

According to ancient chronicles, Prince Kashyapa had killed his father King Dhatusena and fled to Sigiriya to find out a more secure place to prevent retaliation attacks from his half-brother, Mugalan. With the arrival of King Kashyapa, the Bhikkus who were meditated there were requested move to the nearby Pidurangala. In a sort of compensation, King Kashyapa refurbished the temple and made it a prominent place.

The temple 
The temple was said to be , consisting of five main ritual buildings. Among the buildings are Ancient Stupa, Chapter House, Image House, Bodhighara, Preaching hall, Sangharama (Bikku Residence Building) and inscriptions with drip-ledged caves can be seen.

See also
 List of Archaeological Protected Monuments in Matale District

References

External links 
 

Buddhist temples in Matale District
Archaeological protected monuments in Matale District